The General Electric T700 and CT7 are a family of turboshaft and turboprop engines in the  class.

Design and development
In 1967, General Electric began work on a new turboshaft engine demonstrator designated the "GE12" in response to US Army interest in a next-generation utility helicopter. The GE12 was designed and conceived by GE's Art Adamson and Art Adinolfi. In 1967, both GE and Pratt & Whitney were awarded contracts to work parallel with each other to design, fabricate, and test the technology. The Army effort led, in the 1970s, to development of the Sikorsky S-70 Black Hawk, powered by twin GE "T700" turboshafts, the production descendant of the GE12.

The T700 was initially bench-tested in 1973, passed military qualification in 1976, and went into production in 1978. The initial "T700-GE-700" is an ungeared free-turbine turboshaft, with a five-stage axial / one-stage centrifugal mixed-flow compressor, featuring one-piece "blisk" axial stages, with the inlet guide vanes and first two stator stages variable; an annular combustion chamber with central fuel injection to improve combustion and reduce smoke; a two-stage compressor turbine; and a two-stage free power turbine with tip-shrouded blades. The engine is designed for high reliability, featuring an inlet particle separator designed to spin out dirt, sand, and dust. The T700-GE-700 is rated at 1,622 shp (1,210 kW) intermediate power.

The T700-GE-700 was followed by improved and uprated Army engine variants for the UH-60 Black Hawk and the AH-64 Apache helicopters, as well as marinized naval engine variants for the SH-60 Seahawk derivative of the Black Hawk, the SH-2G Seasprite, and the Bell AH-1W Supercobra. T700s are also used on Italian and commercial variants of the AgustaWestland EH101/AW101 helicopter, and Italian variants of the NHIndustries NH90 helicopter. These are all twin-engine machines, except for the three-engined EH101.

The commercial version of the T700 is the "CT7", with the engine used on the Bell 214ST (an enlarged version of the Huey), commercial Black Hawks, and the Sikorsky S-92 derivative of the Black Hawk, all of which are twin-engine helicopters.

The CT7 turboprop variants use the same core as the turboshaft variants, with a propeller gearbox fitted forward of the core. CT7 turboprops are used on variants of the Swedish Saab 340 airliner, the Indonesian-Spanish Airtech CN-235 cargolifter, and the Czech Let L-610G airliner, all twin-turboprop aircraft. The baseline CT7-5A provides 1,735 shp (1,294 kW) on takeoff.

In the late 1980s, GE also proposed a much larger turboprop, the T407/GLC38, with a five-stage axial/one-stage centrifugal mixed-flow compressor, an annular combustor with 15 burners; a two-stage compressor turbine, a three-stage power turbine, and max takeoff power of 6,000 shp (4,475 kW).

The YT706 engine is based on the CT7-8A engine.  Compared with the H-60's primary T700 engine, the T706 has a larger compressor, hot section improvements, and full authority digital engine control. The T706 is rated at 2,600 shp (1,939 kW) and increases the hot-and-high mission capability of the U.S. Army's MH-60M Black Hawk for Special Operations applications.

Variants

T700: Military turboshaft engine.
YT700: Prototype version.
T700-GE-700: Initial T700 variant.
T700-GE-701: The improved T700-GE-701A, -701B, -701C,-701D versions have also been developed from the original -700.
T700-GE-401: Navalised version for SH-60 Seahawk helicopters.
T700-GE-401C: Universal application version of the -401.
T700-GE-701C: Universal application version of the -701.
T700-TEI-701D: Licensed produced version of Tusaş Engine Industries of Turkey. Developed for use in the Sikorsky/Turkish Aerospace Industries T-70 utility helicopter.

CT7 turboshaft: Commercial version of T700.
CT7-2A: Basic model
CT7-2D: Higher flow compressor and surface coatings to improve resistance to wear and corrosion
CT7-2D1: Similar to the CT7-2D but uses a CT7-6 type hot section
CT7-2E1
CT7-6/-6A: The CT7-6/-6A turboshaft engines are upgraded commercial variants of the successful T700/CT7 engine family. The turboshaft engine powers the entire development fleet of AgustaWestland AW101 helicopters with thousands of flight hours of operation.
CT7-8: The CT7-8 is a family of powerful engines in the 2,500 to 3,000 shp class. They are more powerful and more efficient versions of its predecessors.
CT7-8A: A version of the CT7-8 family used to power older Sikorsky S-92/H-92 helicopters.
CT7-8A1: A more fuel efficient version of the CT7-8A. It is used to power newer Sikorsky S-92/H-92 helicopters. The CT7-8A1 produces 2,520 shp. 
CT7-8A5
CT7-8A7: Developed by GE as an uprated, more efficient and more reliable version of the CT7-8A1 engine for the Royal Canadian Air Force's Sikorsky CH-148 Cyclone helicopters. It is the most modern version of the CT7/T700 engine family. The CT7-8A7 produces 3,000 shp.
CT7-8B
CT7-8B5
CT7-8E
CT7-8E5
CT7-8E6
CT7-8F
CT7-8F5

CT7 turboprop: Turboprop version of CT7.
CT7-3:Compact shortened and lightened version.
CT7-5A2
CT7-5A3
CT7-7A
CT7-7A1
CT7-9B
CT7-9B1
CT7-9B2
CT7-9C
CT7-9C3
CT7-9D
CT7-9D2

Applications

T700/CT7 turboshaft
 AgustaWestland AW101
 AgustaWestland CH-149 Cormorant
 Lockheed Martin VH-71 Kestrel
 AgustaWestland AW149
 AgustaWestland AW189
 Bell 214ST
 Bell 525
 Bell AH-1W SuperCobra
 Bell AH-1Z Viper
 Bell UH-1Y Venom
 Boeing AH-64 Apache
 KAI Surion
 Kaman SH-2G Super Seasprite
 Kamov Ka-64 Sky Horse
 Leonardo Helicopters AW249
 NHIndustries NH90
 Sikorsky S-70/H-60 series
 Mitsubishi H-60
 Piasecki X-49
 Sikorsky HH-60 Jayhawk
 Sikorsky HH-60 Pave Hawk
 Sikorsky SH-60 Seahawk
 Sikorsky UH-60 Black Hawk
 Sikorsky S-92
 Sikorsky CH-148 Cyclone

YT706 turboshaft
 Sikorsky MH-60M Black Hawk
 Sikorsky S-97 Raider

CT7 turboprop
 CASA/IPTN CN-235
 Let L-610G
 Saab 340
 Sukhoi Su-80

Specifications (T700)

See also

References

External links

 General Electric T700/CT7 Engine Family page on GE Aviation site
 Jet Engines by Greg Goebel on faqs.org
 General Electric CT7 Cutaway by FlightGlobal.com

T700
1970s turboshaft engines